The Journal of Pediatric Neurosciences is a peer-reviewed open access medical journal published by Medknow Publications on behalf of the Indian Society for Pediatric Neurosurgery. It covers research in pediatric neurology, neurosurgery, neuroimaging, and neuropathology.

Abstracting and indexing 
The journal is abstracted and indexed in:

External links 
 

Open access journals
English-language journals
Biannual journals
Pediatrics journals
Neurology journals
Medknow Publications academic journals
Publications established in 2006
Academic journals associated with learned and professional societies